Yaqui (or Hiaki), locally known as Yoeme or Yoem Noki, is a Native American language of the Uto-Aztecan family. It is spoken by about 20,000 Yaqui people, in the Mexican state of Sonora and across the border in Arizona in the United States. It is partially intelligible with the Mayo language, also spoken in Sonora, and together they are called Cahitan languages.

Phonology

The remarks below use the orthography used by the Pascua Yaqui Tribe in the United States. There are also several orthographic systems used in Mexico differing slightly, mainly in using Spanish values for several consonants and Spanish spelling rules: "rohikte" would be written "rojicte". There are minor differences in the sounds of Mexican and American dialects, the latter tending to exclude an intervocalic "r" and final "k".

Vowels
Yaqui vowel sounds are similar to those of Spanish:

Vowels may be either short or long in duration. Often, long vowels are shortened when the word they are used in is used constructively: 'maaso' ('deer') is shortened to 'maso' in 'maso bwikam' ('deer songs'). Long vowels are written by doubling the vowel. Long vowels may change tone, but that is not represented in the written language. Yaqui has often been described as being a tonal or "pitch accent" language, but the modern forms of the language do not show any widespread and significant use of tonemes.

Consonants

The following consonantal sounds are present in Yaqui: b, ch, (d), (f), (g), h, k, l, m, n, p, r, s, t, v, w, y, and one or two glottal stops (IPA ), represented by an apostrophe. Except for the glottal stops, most of them are pronounced nearly the same as they are in English, but "p", "t", and "k" are not aspirated. In the IPA, they are respectively .

That appears to be intrinsic to Yaqui, rather than from the influence of Spanish, which has a similar feature. Additionally, there are two consonants written as clusters: "bw" (IPA ) and "kt" (IPA ), "bw" being a rounded "b" ('bwikam') and "kt" a simultaneous articulation of "k" and "t" ('rohikte'). The "kt" sound is found in many other Uto-Aztecan languages. Pronunciation of the rounded "b" as "b"+"w" and the "kt" as "k"+"t" is acceptable but non-native.

Also, "d", "f", and "g" are present only in English and Spanish loanwords and are substituted with the native sounds "t"/"r"/"l", "p", and "w"/"k", respectively.

In Mexico, many speakers substitute "g" for syllable-initial "w". That is largely because Spanish lacks a /w/ phoneme. The phone [w] is present in Spanish not as an independent consonantal phoneme but as a variant of the vowel /u/ and the consonant /g/ when it is before a /u/ or /o/. The use of "g" in place of "w" is considered by Yaqui speakers as an influence from Spanish and not standard Yaqui usage, even in Mexico.

Glottal stops
There is at least one glottal stop, which is phonemic. There also appears to be a "fainter" glottal stop that is sometimes used between vowels but with apparently little predictability. Whether it is phonemic or not is still unclear.

Sound symbolism
Sound symbolism is present in Yaqui. For example, a word with the phoneme /l/ in it may be pronounced normally, to denote approval from the speaker, or with /r/ replacing the /l/, to denote disapproval or disfavor on the part of the speaker. Either form is correct.

Devoicing
Devoicing occurs at the ends of phrases. That is especially notable with the phoneme /m/ and with vowels. Yaqui speech often sounds "breathy" to English-speakers.

Gestures
One word, laute, has two contradictory meanings in translation into English: "quickly" and "slowly". (Incidentally, English has similar words of contrasting meanings: mercurial, which can mean either "unhesitating" or "scatter-brained", and quite which can mean "very" or "a little".)

Laute is often accompanied with a quick or slow open-handed movement to indicate the meaning, or it could be translated as "at a different speed" and requires a hand gesture to indicate the nature of the difference when that is needed for clarification.)

Grammar

Syntax
Yaqui word order is generally subject–object–verb.

The object of a sentence is suffixed with "-ta".

Word order structures

Subject object
The following sentences display a variation of the language's structure and the forms allowed. In the following example, we can see an S and an O. This structure of SO is allowable due to a common feature among languages— the verb/ copula to be. 'He' is the subject in this example and since 'he' shows no variation in positioning in the sentence, there will not be further explanation for it. The object in this example 'child' has the possessor 'him' preceding to show ownership, but what is being possessed by 'him' is the child. Therefore, 'child' has a nominalizer for being the object of the sentence and a possession marker on it for being possessed. Having the nominalizer on the 'child' allows the subject 'he' to imply a state of being on the 'child'. This structure SO uses the to be verb/ copula, when information is being stated that x is y.

Subject verb object
In the following example, we can see an example of where the primary word order SOV, deviates to become SVO. Note the pronoun 'I' doesn't have any case marking active and is in pronoun form (see Cases on Pronouns). Next, on the first or main verb 'able', there isn't any specification for the type of verb. When the main verb is followed by another verb, it seems the second verb becomes intransitivized. On the object of the sentence 'axe', there are multiple cases active: accusative case (the direct object of the verb), a plural suffix, and an instrumental case (the means by how or with what something gets done) on the noun.

Object subject verb
The following is an additional example that shows variant in word order than previously seen— OSV. In this structure, a suffix called connective is used to show that two constituents are being connected; simply, they function as a conjunction. Although this is a simple function, it is worth mentioning in understanding the way Yaqui functions as a system. The subject comes after the object in the correct subject pronoun form. Following is the verb 'remember', which may be a trigger to the word order. Perhaps this word order implies the topic should be who/what is being remembered.

Case
Yaqui is a "noun-heavy" agglutinative language.

For example, the first person singular pronoun "in" or "ne" (which varies by dialect), is more often used in the form "inepo", which can be translated "within me". The "-(e)po" ending is quite common and seems to denote much more than simple physical inclusion.

Cases are marked on the nouns with suffixes. The following is a list of all the cases that are marked in the language.

Nouns
Plural nouns are formed by adding the suffix "-im", or "-m" if the noun ends in a vowel. If the noun ends in a "t", it changes to "ch" when "-im" is added.

 Tekil - Job
 Tekilim - Jobs

If a plural noun is the object of a sentence, the suffixation of "-t" or "-ta" is not used.

Verbs
Usually, adding the suffix "-k" to a verb indicates past tense, though there are many exceptions. If a verb ends in a diphthong, "-kan" is added. If a verb ends in "-i", "-akan" is added. If a verb ends in "-o" or "-u", "-ekan" is added, and if a verb ends in "-a", "-ikan" is added. If a verb ends in "-k", "-an" is added.

Regularly, "-ne" indicates the future.

Tense and aspect
Yaqui possess a "prior state" or 'used to be, now deceased' suffix. It is -tu-káꞋu. This specific suffix attaches to a nominal noun to indicate a prior existence, but can also attach as a verb to reflect the state of a human noun (not only animate). For example, (suffixed as a verb) to the right.

The following is a table on the various tense markers that act more as aspectual values and epistemic states.

Adjectives
In Yaqui, adjectives very often act as verbs (in Afro-Asiatic linguistics, they would be called stative verbs). For instance, "vemela" or "new", would most often be used to mean "is new". Adjectives have tenses, the same as verbs.

Reduplication

Reduplication is present in Yaqui. 
Reduplicating the first syllable of a verb indicates habitual action:

 eta - shuts
 e'eta - usually shuts

Primary reduplication is also used to pluralize adjectives.

Reduplicating the second consonant of a verb is used to show that an action is performed rarely.

Sample words and phrases
 o'ow - man
 hamut - woman
 tu'i hiapsek - kind (lit. "good hearted")
 yantela - peace
 halla'i - friend
 maaso - deer
 aamu - to hunt
 totoi (plural. totoim) - chicken

 aman ne tevote em yevihnewi - "I extend my greetings"

Greetings often are very formal. The following formula of four phrases is often used even among close friends:
 Lios em chania - "Greetings!" (to one person, to more than one: Lios em chaniavu) (lit. "God preserves you!", Lios [sometimes pronounced Lioh] is a very early borrowing of the Spanish "Dios")
 Lios em chiokoe - (the reply to the above, lit. "God pardons you!")
 Empo allea - "May you rejoice!" (lit. "In you happy", 'allea' is said to be from the Spanish 'alegre', meaning 'happy')
 Kettu'i - "How kind!"

Kinship terminology

Language revitalization and teaching 
In 2009, the Pascua Yaqui Tribal Council and the University of Arizona collaborated on a program in which tribal elders teach the Yaqui language to families. As of 2010, a revitalization project was underway at the university, "using 30 year old audio tapes recorded by tribal member Maria Leyva." As of 2012, "Any teaching materials, tools, lessons, audio lessons, etc.," on the website of the Pascua Yaqui Tribe were "restricted to 'Tribally enrolled Members' only."

References

Bibliography

Estrada Fernández, Zarina (2004). Diccionario yaqui-español y textos: Obra de preservación lingüística. Sonora, México: Universidad de Sonora/Plaza y Valdés Editores
 Johnson, Jean Bassett (1962, posthumous). El Idioma Yaqui. Mexico DF: Instituto Nacional de Antropologia e Historia.
 Shaul, David L. (1999). Yoeme-English English-Yoeme Standard Dictionary. New York: Hippocrene Books.

External links

Yaqui Vocabulary List, from the World Loanword Database
Yaqui Swadesh vocabulary list from Wiktionary
Yaqui Indian Language (Yoeme)
OLAC resources in and about the Yaqui language
Constitution of Mexico in Yaqui
A PRELIMINARY SKETCH OF THE YAQUI LANGUAGE

Agglutinative languages
Southern Uto-Aztecan languages
Indigenous languages of Mexico
Languages of the United States
Native American language revitalization
Indigenous languages of Arizona
Indigenous languages of the Southwestern United States
Indigenous languages of the North American Southwest
Yaqui culture
Subject–object–verb languages